Qarshi University (QU) (Urdu:) is a project of Qarshi Foundation; a non-profit welfare organization funded by the Qarshi family. It was established in 2011. It is recognized by the Higher Education Commission of Pakistan.

All the academic programs are geared to create up-to-date and upright business and social leaders who are:
 Known to possess the ability to systematically think, analyze and solve problems;
 Imbued with love and respect for law, country religion and fellow human beings;
 Conscious of their place in an increasingly interdependent world to manifest their worth as individuals and as members of the community through hard work.
As a not-for-profit organisation, the University aims to provide scientific and humanistic knowledge through research and interdisciplinary approaches. To this end, it aims at forming intellectually competent graduates.

Departments 
 Department of Biotechnology
 Department of Management Sciences
 Department of Computer Sciences
 Department of Eastern Medicine

References

External links 
 QU official website

Universities and colleges in Lahore
Educational institutions established in 2011
Private universities and colleges in Punjab, Pakistan
2011 establishments in Pakistan